Ivey Business School is a constituent unit of the University of Western Ontario, located in London, Ontario, Canada. Ivey offers full-time undergraduate (HBA), MBA, MSc, MFE and PhD programs and also maintains two teaching facilities in Toronto and Hong Kong for its EMBA and Executive Education programs. It is credited with establishing the nation's first MBA and PhD program in Business.

The business school was officially created in 1949, when Western University created a separate faculty as the School of Business Administration. In 1995, the school was renamed the Richard Ivey School of Business after an $11 million donation by the Richard M. Ivey family. The school is named after Richard G. Ivey (father of Richard M. Ivey). In 1998, Ivey was the first North American business school to open a campus in Hong Kong offering an Executive MBA program at the Cheng Yu Tung Management Institute.

In 2010, Ivey became the first North American business school to offer the  CEMS Global Alliance in Management Education, joining the likes of London School of Economics, HEC Paris, ESADE, University of St. Gallen, and Bocconi University.

In 2013, the School abbreviated its name to "Ivey Business School" and updated its visual identity. The legal name of the Faculty of Business at Western University, however, remains Richard Ivey School of Business.

On May 6, 2019, former IBM executive Sharon Hodgson became the Dean of Ivey.

Programs
The Ivey Business School offers a number of programs and degrees:

Honors Business Administration
The Ivey HBA (Honours Business Administration) was the first degree program in business at the University of Western Ontario. A class of six men were the program's first graduates in 1923.

In 2010, the HBA program grew to 525 students with the final program size of 610 students in place since 2013.

The HBA program is a second-entry, two-year program that enrolls students who have completed two years of undergraduate study (in any faculty at any recognized university). First year Ivey students, known as HBA1s, are typically in their third year of university. Previously, prospective students applied for admission to Ivey during their second year of university. In 1998, Ivey introduced the Advanced Entry Opportunity status (AEO), a conditional pre-admission status offered to secondary school students. Advanced Entry Opportunity (AEO) students may study in any faculty of interest at the University of Western Ontario for their first two years of university.

The HBA1 year has no elective course work. HBAs are placed into "sections" of 76 students and work with the same classmates and professors in the same classroom year-round. The curriculum includes courses in finance, accounting, marketing, operations management, organizational behavior, and general management. The HBA2 year is less structured with students taking four required courses along with elective courses that tailor to individual interests.

Master of Business Administration
The Ivey full-time MBA was created in 1948 and was Canada's first MBA program as well as the first one offered outside of the United States. Its first class graduated in 1950. It was modeled on the Harvard Business School MBA as a two-year program. In 2006, it was converted to a 12-month program and was relocated from the University of Western Ontario campus to the Spencer Leadership Centre.  A Health Sector Stream is offered through the Ivey Centre for Health Innovation and Leadership.

With over 25,000 alumni in 105 countries. Ivey offers networking opportunities.

 The Alumni Partnership Program involves top Ivey alumni who have volunteered to act as mentors to current students and alumni. Students can choose to be partner with an alumnus based on a number of criteria including function, industry or geography.
 The "Get Connected" event in Toronto is hosted by Ivey's Career Management team in partnership with its alumni and recruiting firms. For three days, students are exposed to information sessions, formal networking events, functional panels and mock interviewing events with Ivey recruiters and alumni. This is the students’ official ‘debut’ or introduction to the market, following their 12-weeks of in-class Career Management programming.
 Global Ivey Day is an annual event for Ivey students and alumni around the world. Events are hosted by alumni chapters, including a Gala event in Toronto, with live webinars and webcasts available for alums and students to join as well.

Master of Science in Management
The Ivey MSc is a direct-entry program requiring no previous full-time work experience. The Ivey MSc program is based on the case method and global learning opportunities, designed to prepare the student for an international career.

In December 2009, Ivey was selected as the first Canadian partner in the CEMS Global Alliance in Management Education and in 2012 was named the CEMS School of the Year. This  gives Ivey MSc students the opportunity to participate in the Master of International Management program with students from 29 other schools in the alliance. Students register as Ivey MSc students and pursue the CEMS MIM program concurrently.

In 2016, a second stream in the MSc program was launched in Business Analytics. In both streams of the program, students undertake 3 terms of academic study and 1 term placement in an industry internship. This was complemented in 2021 with a third stream, MSc Digital Management.

PhD
The University of Western Ontario began offering a PhD in Business Administration in 1961, Canada's first PhD in business. The program has focused on study in eight disciplines: Finance, General Management, Information Systems, Management Science, Managerial Accounting, Marketing, Operations Management and Organizational Behaviour.

Executive MBA program
The Ivey Executive MBA (EMBA) was founded in 1991 with the addition of a Hong Kong-based program and a remote video-conference program in 1995. In 2007, the program's headquarters was relocated to a new facility in downtown Toronto named the Tangerine Leadership Centre. The program provides a part-time MBA program for working managers with at least seven years of work experience. The program consists of four in-class days (Thursday to Sunday) once per month. Classes continue for three consecutive terms, each five months long.

Pre-HBA Undergraduate Courses
Ivey also offers five undergraduate business courses, organized under the Business Foundations Group.
Business 1220E (BUS 1220E): A comprehensive business course for first-year students, covering finance, marketing, operations, organizational behaviour, enterprise strategy, and valuation.
Business 1299E (BUS 1299E): A variant of 1220E for engineering students, identical except for the inclusion of time value of money in the operations and valuation components of the course. Successful completion of this course is a graduation requirement for students in the engineering program.
Business 2257 (BUS 2257): A second-year course with a focus on Financial Accounting, Business Analysis and Managerial Accounting. This course is a prerequisite course for the HBA program.
Business for Science Students 2295F (BUS 2257): Introductory course in business designed for Science, Medical and Dentistry students. This is a half-year course, covering a selection of topics covered in the full-year BUS 1220E course.
Business for Engineers 2299E (BUS 2299E): The predecessor to BUS 1299E. This is a fourth-year course being transitioned out in favour of BUS 1299E.

Collaborative program
MFE or Master in Financial Economics is a collaborative program between Ivey Business School, Western Economics and Math/Stat department.

Locations
Ivey operates on four campuses:
Richard Ivey Building on the main campus of the University of Western Ontario.
Spencer Leadership Centre (formally known as Spencer Hall) in London, Ontario
Donald K. Johnson Leadership Centre located in downtown Toronto at the Exchange Tower
Cheng Yu Tung Management Institute is located in the Hong Kong Convention and Exhibition Centre

On September 10, 2009, Ivey broke ground on a new  faculty building on the Western campus in front of Brescia University College on former soccer fields. The project cost approximately $110 million, with the federal and provincial governments contributed $50 million in funding with the remainder funded by private donations. The building was to be designed by Hariri Pontarini Architects of Toronto. In September 2013, Ivey officially moved from their old building to new Richard Ivey Building located across campus.

Publications

Case studies

With over 8,000 cases in their collection, Ivey Publishing adds more than 350 classroom-tested case studies each year.  Ivey is among the largest producers and publishers of cases all around the world, just behind Harvard Business School. Recently, Ivey signed deals with Indian Institute of Management Calcutta to design and publish case studies.

Ivey Business Journal
Ivey Business Journal (IBJ) started in 1933 as the Quarterly Review of Commerce. The publication transitioned from a quarterly magazine to a bi-monthly web publication in the 2000s and is read in over 150 countries. The current editor of the journal is Thomas Watson.

Ivey Business Review
Ivey Business Review (IBR) is an undergraduate publication dealing with  business strategy,  written and managed by students in the honours business administration program at the School. It is published twice per academic year, in December and April, and is managed at the school's main campus in London, Ontario. Published copies of IBR are available in print formator on the publication's website. Since its inception, the magazine has published eight issues containing over 100 total articles and involving more than 150 students.

The Review is an original research–based publication with all content created  for the magazine through collaboration between the writers and members of the editorial board. It focuses on providing actionable recommendations for specific businesses, industries, business models, strategies, or events, rather than management techniques for managers and leaders.

Notable alumni and faculty

Thomas H. Bailey, founder Janus Capital
Tima Bansal, Chaired Professor of Strategy, Director of Ivey's Centre on Building Sustainable Value.
Hitish "Tesher" Sharma, Canadian rapper and singer-songwriter
Sukhinder Singh Cassidy, founder and chairman, TheBoardlist, tech founder and executive
 John Chayka, former General Manager, Arizona Coyotes
 Henry Cheng, Chairman, New World Development Co. Ltd.
 Dean A. Connor, President and CEO, Sun Life Financial
 George Cope, former President and CEO, Bell Canada
 Cynthia Devine, CFO, Maple Leafs Sports and Entertainment, former CFO, RioCan REIT, Tim Hortons Inc.
 Bob Singh Dhillon, venture capitalist, CBC's Dragon's Den
 David Furnish, Executive and Board, Ogilvy & Mather
 Don Getty, Premier of Alberta
 Stephen K. Gunn, co-founder and chairman, Sleep Country Canada
 Donald K. Johnson, Advisory Board, BMO Capital Markets
 Michael Katchen, founder and CEO, Wealthsimple
 Gar Knutson, Member of Parliament
 Arkadi Kuhlmann, chairman and CEO, ING Group
 Simu Liu, actor, Shang-Chi and the Legend of the Ten Rings, Kim's Convenience; former accountant, Deloitte
 Christine Magee, co-founder and President, Sleep Country Canada
 Michael McCain, President and CEO, Maple Leaf Foods
 David I. McKay, President and CEO, Royal Bank of Canada
 Pierre Morrisette, founder, Pelmorex, operator of The Weather Network
 Ray Muzyka, CEO,  BioWare
 Richard Nesbitt, President and CEO, CIBC World Markets, former CEO, TMX Group
 Dave Nichol, founder, President's Choice
 Robert Nourse, founder Bombay Company
 Kevin O'Leary, Venture Capitalist, CBC's Dragon's Den
 Larry Rosen, chairman and CEO, Harry Rosen Inc.
 Ray Sharma, Founder and CEO, XMG Studio
 Charles Sousa, former MPP and Minister of Finance
 Bernard Trottier, former Member of Parliament
 Prem Watsa, CEO, Fairfax Financial Holdings
 Darryl White, CEO, Bank of Montreal

Rankings

Financial Times has ranked Ivey the No. 1 MBA program in Canada in their Global MBA Ranking 2020.
For six years running, Bloomberg Businessweek has ranked Ivey the No. 1 MBA program in Canada (2014-2019).
Financial Post (January 2014): reported that Ivey alumni obtain the highest salary among any other Canadian business school graduates
Bloomberg (January 2015): reported that 52% of all Ivey alumni hold the title of Chair, President, C-Suite, Vice-President, Managing Director or Partner 
Wall Street Journal MBA (September 2007): In The Wall Street Journal's 7th annual ranking of MBA programs, which is based on the perceptions of corporate recruiters around the globe, Ivey was ranked No. 12 among the top 25 internationally focused business schools.
Financial Times MBA, In the Financial Times 2016 annual ranking of MBA programs worldwide, Ivey ranked 88th of the top 100 business schools. Also the same ranking puts Ivey as the 26th business school in FT research rank.
QS Top MBA places Ivey as the 12th best MBA program in North America for 2012.  The QS Global 200 Business Schools Report are based on employer perceptions of graduates of the programs.
The Economist, In 2018 The Economist ranked Ivey's MBA program No. 1 in Canada, and 60th globally.

Canadian MBA Alliance 
The school is also a founding member of the Canadian MBA Alliance which was created in 2013. All six members of the alliance rank among the world’s top 100 schools, according to their participation in key rankings – Financial Times, Business Week, and The Economist.

Further reading

 Murray Llewellyn Barr 'A century of medicine at Western: a centennial history of the Faculty of Medicine, University of Western Ontario' (London: University of Western Ontario, 1977)
 John R. W. Gwynne-Timothy 'Western's first century' (London: University of Western Ontario, 1978)
 Ruth Davis Talman 'The beginnings and development of the University of Western Ontario, 1878–1924.' (MA Thesis, University of Western Ontario, 1925)

See also
 Ivey Index

References

External links

Business schools in Canada
University of Western Ontario
Educational institutions established in 1922
1922 establishments in Ontario
Accounting schools in Canada